Delhi-6 is the soundtrack album to Rakeysh Omprakash Mehra's 2009 film of the same name. A. R. Rahman scored the film, collaborating a second time with Mehra after Rang De Basanti, and Prasoon Joshi penned the lyrics. The music was released on 14 January 2009 at the Indian Idol 4 competition.

The first video of the song "Masakali" was released featuring Sonam and Abhishek with a pigeon. However, the song was not part of the original film. According to the director, "The song was not really meant to be part of the narrative. I mean, who would think of putting in a song about a dove in a film like Delhi-6? It just happened. When I came to the pre-climax portion of my script, I was stuck. I needed a continuity link taking the narrative to its finale". Other videos released include the title track Delhi-6, the romantic interlude "Rehna Tu" as well as the folky "Genda Phool", an adaptation of a folk song from Chhattisgarh. Rajat Dholakia who is known for introducing Chhattisgarhi folk songs to Bollywood has been co credited with Rahman for the song Genda Phool. The music of the track "Bhor Bhaye" is based on the raga, Gujri Todi. It is an adaptation of Bade Ghulam Ali Khan's original version, arranged by Rahman. Traditional lyrics have been used there by Joshi. The Ustad (whose demise took place in 1968) did not record this song separately for the film soundtrack. Shreya Ghoshal's vocals have been superimposed on the Ustad's vocals (from his original song) at parts.

Reception

The album received widespread acclaim. A review on Bollywood Hungama said, "Delhi 6 is near perfect. Rahman beats his own score with Delhi 6 which would easily go down as one of his best scores till date." According to Rediff's Sukanya Verma, "A. R. Rahman makes waiting for his music such a worthwhile chore what with one fantastic soundtrack after another. Close on the heels of a deserving Golden Globes wins follows the anticipated score of Rakeysh Omprakash Mehra's Delhi 6. Considering its impossible-to-define Chandni Chowk roots, Rahman injects the sounds of this 10-tracked album with an eclectic fusion of various genres."

Track listing
The official track listing.

Awards
Filmfare Awards
Won, Best Music Direction - A. R. Rahman
Won, Best Male Playback - Mohit Chauhan for "Masakali"
Won, Best Female Playback - Rekha Bhardwaj for "Genda Phool"
Nominated, Best Male Playback - Javed Ali for "Arziyan"
Nominated, Best Male Playback - Kailash Kher for "Arziyan"
Nominated, Best Lyrics - Prasoon Joshi for "Rehna Tu"
Nominated, Best Lyrics - Prasoon Joshi for "Masakali"

2nd Mirchi Music Awards
 Won, Song of The Year - "Masakali"
 Won, Album of The Year - A.R Rahman, Prasoon Joshi
 Won, Male Vocalist of The Year - Mohit Chauhan for "Masakali"
 Won, Female Vocalist of The Year - Rekha Bhardwaj for "Genda Phool"
 Won, Music Composer of The Year - A.R Rahman for "Masakali"
 Won, Lyricist of The Year - Prasoon Joshi for "Masakali"
 Won, Best Song Arranger & Programmer - A.R Rahman for "Masakali"
 Won, Best Song Mixing & Engineering - H. Sridhar, S. Sivakumar , P. A. Deepak and Vivianne Chaix for "Dilli-6"

Star Screen Awards
Won, Best Music Direction - A. R. Rahman
Nominated, Best Female Playback - Rekha Bhardwaj for "Genda Phool"
Nominated, Best Male Playback - Mohit Chauhan for "Masakkali"

International Indian Film Academy Awards
Nominated, Best Music Direction - A. R. Rahman
Nominated, Best Lyrics - Prasoon Joshi
Nominated, Best Female Playback - Rekha Bhardwaj for "Genda Phool"
Nominated, Best Male Playback - Mohit Chauhan for "Masakkali"

Legacy 
The song Masakali was recreated by music director Tanishk Bagchi for the film Marjaavaan, but could not make it to the film. The song, when released, was met with severe negative criticism from the audience and the actors alike. The record label T-Series then released it as a single music video. After the release, the song faced an unprecedented response from the original composer A. R. Rahman, followed by lyricist Prasoon Joshi and director Rakeysh Omprakash Mehra. Urging audience to listen the original song AR Rahman tweeted-

No short cuts, properly commissioned, sleepless nights, writes and re-writes. Over 200 musicians, 365 days of creative brainstorming with the aim to produce music that can last generations. A team of a Director, a Composer and a Lyricist supported by actors, dance directors and a relentless film crew.” - Lots of love and prayers A.R. Rahman.

The song also faced unabashed criticism from the netizens. Even the Jaipur police joined the troll army by saying-
If you are unnecessarily roaming outside, we will put you in a room and play Masakali 2.0 on loop.

References 

A. R. Rahman soundtracks
Hindi film soundtracks
2009 soundtrack albums
T-Series (company) soundtrack albums